Sydney Basil Minch (14 June 1893 – 25 March 1970) was an Irish politician, army officer and brewer.

He was born 14 June 1893 in Rockfield, Athy, County Kildare, one of five sons of Matthew Minch, nationalist and anti-Parnellite MP for Kildare South, and Agnes Minch (née Hayden).

He was educated at the Dominican convent, Wicklow; Belvedere College, Dublin and Clongowes Wood College. He fought with the 16th (Irish) Division at the Third Battle of Ypres during World War I, achieving the rank of captain.

He was first elected to Dáil Éireann as a Cumann na nGaedheal Teachta Dála (TD) for the Kildare constituency at the 1932 general election. He was re-elected at the 1933 general election. At the 1937 general election, he was elected as a Fine Gael TD for the Carlow–Kildare constituency. He lost his seat at the 1938 general election. A prominent figure in the Blueshirts, he was the first TD to wear a symbolic blue shirt in Dáil Éireann on 27 September 1933, but was opposed to the fascistic tendencies of the organisation.

On leaving politics he became a director of the family malt firm, Minch, Norton & Co.

References

1893 births
1970 deaths
Cumann na nGaedheal TDs
Fine Gael TDs
Members of the 7th Dáil
Members of the 8th Dáil
Members of the 9th Dáil
Politicians from County Kildare
Irish people of World War I
British Army personnel of World War I
People educated at Clongowes Wood College
Irish officers in the British Army
British Army officers